Henslowia may refer to:
 Henslowia (plant), a genus of plants in the family Santalaceae
 Henslowia, a genus of plants in the family Crypteroniaceae, synonym of Crypteronia
 Henslowia, a genus of plants in the family Oleaceae, synonym of Picconia